The Purple Line of the Chicago "L" is a  route on the northernmost section of the system. In 2021, the average weekday boardings on the Purple Line was 3,382. It is the shortest route in the CTA rail system except during weekday peaks and rush hours.

The express service is known as the Purple Line Express (or the Evanston Express).

Prior to the color-coding of CTA rail lines in 1993, the Purple Line was known as the Evanston Line, Evanston Service or Evanston Shuttle, and the Purple Line Express was called the Evanston Express.

The selection of purple as the line's color was likely from Northwestern's official school color.

Operation

Trackage
Beginning at Linden Avenue in Wilmette, which contains a small storage yard and car service shop, the Purple Line traverses the North Shore area on private right-of-way which begins at street grade. Running southeasterly from Wilmette, the line rises past Isabella Street on the Wilmette-Evanston border then bridges the North Shore Channel immediately north of Central Street, the first stop in Evanston. The line, now on an elevated embankment, curves southward parallel to Sherman Avenue. Continuing south, the line enters downtown Evanston and stops at Davis Street, then curves southeasterly again to parallel Chicago Avenue and Metra's Union Pacific Railroad right-of-way to Clark Street just north of the CTA's Howard Yard facilities.

Here the line crosses through the yard area before the junction with the Red Line and the Yellow Line. The tracks are split on grade separated structures to allow Yellow Line trains to enter the junction from the west. Immediately south of the yard lies the Howard Street terminal, where Red, Purple and Yellow Line trains all terminate.

There are four operational tracks starting at Howard Street, continuing on to Armitage Avenue. During weekday rush hours, the Purple Line runs express on the outer tracks, skipping all stops until Wilson Avenue, and then to Belmont Avenue. From Belmont Avenue to Armitage Avenue, the Purple and Brown Lines share the outside tracks and both make all stops along the route. From just south of Armitage Avenue to just north of Chicago Avenue, they are on a two track line on a 4-track structure. After the North Shore Line ceased operations in 1963, the outer tracks in this area were rarely used and received next to no maintenance; they were permanently taken out of service in 1976.

Routing

The original routing of the Purple Line Express was clockwise around the Inner Loop track via Lake-Wabash-Van Buren-Wells, making all Loop stops before returning to Merchandise Mart and making all stops northbound to Linden. Beginning April 2, 2007, the Purple Line Express was rerouted onto the Outer Loop track along with the Brown Line due to the construction at the Belmont and Fullerton stations (see below). Prior to this, Purple Line Express trains were occasionally diverted to the Outer Loop track in the event of emergencies or signal problems in the Loop. On December 4, 2008, the CTA announced that the Purple Line Express would return to the original Inner Loop routing on December 29.

If a problem occurs on the North Side Main Line between the Loop and the Fullerton station, the Purple Line is generally routed into the State Street subway, following the Red Line to  before returning north.

For several years, inbound afternoon Purple Line Express trains stopped at  before weekday evening Chicago Cubs baseball games, in order to provide direct service to Wrigley Field for passengers from northern Chicago, Evanston and Skokie. However, because of a platform reconfiguration in the early 1990s, trains had to cross over to the inner Red Line tracks, as there is no platform access to the outer tracks at Addison. As a result of the Brown Line construction and in effort to minimize delays, trains now stop one station north at Sheridan Road before evening Cubs games. The station was constructed with two island platforms that can access the express tracks, eliminating the need for trains to switch over.

Connections
During its weekday rush hour route, the Purple Line Express is one of only two 'L' lines to have transfers to every other line, the other being the Red Line. The Purple Line Express is also the only 'L' line to provide non-farecard transfers to every other line (the Red Line does not provide a non-farecard transfer to the Pink Line).

Rolling stock
The Purple Line is operated with the Bombardier-built 5000-series railcars. Until late May 2014, the 2400-series cars were also assigned to the line; for the entire 2000s and early 2010s, the Purple Line fleet consisted entirely, or nearly entirely of 2400-series cars. In spring 2007, small numbers of 3200-series railcars were transferred to the line, replacing the 2600-series railcars transferred to other lines, the 3200-series cars have since been returned to their original line assignments. The 2600-series cars were officially assigned to the line until early January 2013 when they were transferred to the Red and Blue Lines. 

Beginning in October 2013, the CTA started to reassign the 2600-series cars back to the line as they get displaced by the new Bombardier-built 5000-series cars on the Red Line. Beginning in April 2014, CTA started to assign some Bombardier-built 5000-series cars to the line. In May 2014, the last 2400-series cars were removed from service from the line. The 2600-series cars were removed from service from the line in March 2015. The Purple Line typically runs with six cars. Occasionally, the Purple Line borrows cars from the Red Line when short on cars.

Operating hours and headways
The Purple Line operates full-time between Linden and Howard from Mondays to Thursdays from 4:25 a.m. to 1:30 a.m., Fridays from 4:30 a.m. to 2:10 a.m., Saturdays from 5:05 a.m. to 2:15 a.m. and Sundays from 6:05 a.m. to 1:45 a.m. On weekdays, frequencies consist of 12tph (trains per hour) during rush hours, 6tph during middays, then 4-5tph during the evening and 3tph after midnight. On weekdays, service operates 4tph early morning and night and 5tph and late afternoons.

The Purple Line Express operates rush hour service between Linden and the Loop on weekday morning only from 5:15 a.m. to 9:20 a.m. (northbound) and from 5:55 a.m. to 10:05 a.m. (southbound). On weekday evenings, service resumes from 2:25 to 6:25 p.m. (southbound) and from 3:05 p.m. to 7:05 p.m. (northbound), with headways of five to eight minutes (with wider headways of 15 minutes possible).

History

The Northwestern Elevated era
The Evanston Line was placed in operation on May 16, 1908, between Central Street, Evanston and the Loop when the former Northwestern Elevated Railroad extended its mainline service over leased electrified steam railroad trackage owned by the Chicago, Milwaukee, St. Paul and Pacific Railroad. On April 2, 1912, the line reached its present-day terminal at Linden Avenue, Wilmette. The new terminal was established without permission of Wilmette residents, who feared rail service would encourage construction of large apartment buildings in the affluent community.

In 1922, the surface level section of the North Side 'L' was elevated onto a concrete embankment structure between Leland Avenue and Howard Street and was expanded from two to four tracks, allowing complete express service from Wilmette and Evanston to downtown Chicago. Several segments of the Evanston Branch itself ran at street level until 1928, when it was elevated onto a concrete embankment between Church Street and the North Shore Channel. It was placed in operation on January 29, 1928. Nine stations existed after Howard, including a station at Calvary.

CTA era

The current service which was to become the Purple Line went into effect on July 31, 1949, after a massive service reorientation on the North–South rapid transit system by the still infant Chicago Transit Authority. Local service was restricted between Linden Avenue and Howard Street, operating at all times. The express service ran weekday rush hours only, stopping at all stations in Wilmette and Evanston, plus Howard,  (formerly Rogers Park), Chicago/Franklin, Merchandise Mart and all Loop stations. While skip-stop service was also introduced at this time, Evanston trains continued to make all stops at their stations. An express surcharge was also instituted for customers traveling to and from the Loop past Howard. Several attempts were made to reduce or eliminate the fare, backed by local politicians.

Right-of-way and trackage used by the Evanston Branch and the North–South Route (today's Red Line) between Leland Avenue and the Wilmette terminal was purchased by the CTA in 1953 from the Chicago, Milwaukee, St. Paul and Pacific Railroad. In turn, the railroad received $7 million USD in CTA revenue bonds.

Midday and Saturday Loop Express service was discontinued in the 1950s and the local shuttle service began using one-man operations with single unit cars in the 1960s.

On July 16, 1973, the  station closed, bringing the total number of stations on the Evanston branch to eight.

Prior to this, Evanston shuttle trains had to be equipped with trolley poles and power collected through overhead catenary wires (similar to the Yellow Line before its conversion to third rail in 2004). The conversion to third rail allowed the CTA to retire the 4000-Series, which were nearly 50 years old and put newer cars on the line. Since parts of the line are at grade level, some community members initially resisted the conversion and worried the proximity of the rail would be hazardous.

By the end of 1976, the Evanston Express ran nonstop between Howard and Merchandise Mart, no longer stopping at Morse, Loyola, Wilson or Chicago/Franklin. The CTA cited complaints about delays in service due to the extra stops as justification for their removal.

However, on January 20, 1989, express trains once more began making additional stops outside the Loop, at the Belmont and Fullerton stations, in order to relieve overcrowding on the rapidly growing Ravenswood branch (now the Brown Line). By the end of the 1990s, trains would make all stops between Belmont and the Loop.

The express surcharge was eventually dropped in 1997 as an incentive for customers to use the new TransitCard system.

The overnight "owl service" was eliminated during a service purge by the CTA on April 26, 1998. However, the hours of express operation were expanded on December 16, 2001, for a 180-day trial period. Trains departed Linden for downtown one hour earlier in the morning rush and one hour later in the evening rush. The expanded hours were later made permanent and in 2004 afternoon rush service was also revised to begin 25 minutes earlier.

In 2005, the CTA embarked on a project to replace six deteriorating viaducts on the Evanston branch of the Purple Line. The poor condition of the century-old viaducts forced the implementation of permanent slow zones and were a point of contention for many Evanston politicians. They claimed CTA had secured funds and promised to begin replacing the viaducts starting in 1999, but had diverted the funds to other projects. The CTA responded that it only provided projected uses and had not committed the money to any specific purpose. The Main Street viaduct was completely replaced over the weekend of November 12–13, 2005, requiring the temporary shutdown of the Purple Line. Construction was completed by the Monday morning rush hour. The Church Street viaduct was replaced next; preliminary work at that location began in July 2006 and the new viaduct was installed in late October 2006 during another weekend closure of the Purple Line.

The Purple Line's Howard terminal underwent a major renovation from 2006 until 2009, during that time it was completely rebuilt and made ADA-accessible. Major work on the station progressed throughout 2007, causing temporary platform boarding changes, typically on the weekends.

The Purple Line Express has often been targeted for elimination during service purges due to its "auxiliary" nature compared to other CTA rail lines, the rationalization being that there are readily available, albeit slower, alternatives along its entire route. One of the first moves at halting express service came in 1973 while one of the most recent was in 2005, when threatened service cuts included the Purple Line Express.

The CTA budget crisis continued into 2007 and the Purple Line Express was once again selected as one of several routes to be eliminated if additional funding was not provided. The suggested service cuts would have taken effect September 17, 2007. However, the final plan retained the downtown service, making the stop at the Sheridan station permanent to supplement the Red Line and provide additional capacity on the system following the elimination of thirty-nine bus routes. Express operation would be a day-to-day decision; if the Red Line was too crowded, Purple Line Express trains would make all local stops between Howard and Belmont, resuming the regular route at that station.

The service cuts were scheduled to be implemented on September 16, 2007, but the CTA received a last-minute $24 million advance on its 2008 operating subsidy, postponing the changes until November 4, 2007. A last-minute $21 million grant from the governor once again postponed the changes to January 20, 2008, this time including the elimination of 42 additional routes. However, the Illinois Legislature successfully passed HB656, a transit funding package, on January 17, 2008, providing the CTA with sufficient operating funds and preventing the service cuts.

The CTA also embarked on a $530 million project to rehabilitate and replace stations and infrastructure along the Brown Line. This project was completed in December 2009. Seven of the stations that were included in the project are shared with the Purple Line, along with the associated trackage and signals from north of the Belmont station to the Loop. Beginning April 2, 2007, operation on the Purple, Brown and Red Lines between Addison and Armitage was restricted to three tracks, down from the previous four, due to construction at the Fullerton and Belmont stations. 

Because of this, fewer trains operated to downtown during the rush period in order to prevent a bottleneck. Only every other train was sent to the Loop during rush periods; all other trains operated between Linden and Howard only. Full service has since been restored. In addition, the Purple Line Express routing was changed to the Outer Loop, rather than along the Inner Loop, in order to provide riders more options for accessing stations between Belmont and the Loop. This line was returned to the Inner Loop in Spring 2009.

Canceled project
One form of the CTA's Circle Line plan would call for a rerouting of the Purple Line Express service. Rather than continue to the Loop along with the Brown Line, trains would follow the Red Line after Belmont, making a stop at Fullerton and all current Red Line subway stops and terminate at a new station on Wentworth before heading north. However, this is merely a study and the final form of the Circle Line and its effects on current CTA rail service, if the project begins at all, remain to be seen.

Destination signs
These are the destination signs used by the Purple Line since 1993, when they began displaying the route name on the line color background.

Station listing

Between Clark/Lake and Washington/Wells, Purple Line Express trains operate clockwise around the Inner Loop. After stopping at Washington/Wells, trains return to Merchandise Mart then make all stops back to Linden.

References

External links

 Purple Line at CTA official site

 
Evanston, Illinois
Railway lines in Chicago
Railway lines opened in 1949
1949 establishments in Illinois